Pierre Marie Joseph Veuillot (5 January 1913 – 14 February 1968) was a Roman Catholic Cardinal and Archbishop of Paris.

Life
After having frequented the first year of the graduate course of Medicine, he joined the Carmes Seminary in Rue d'Assas, Paris, near his parent home of rue du Pré-aux-Clercs. He was admitted thanks to a derogation granted by the cardinal Verdier for his bad health conditions. He graduated in Scholastic philosophy and then was enrolled in the French Army where he became an artillery official. 
From 1932 to 1937, he studied Letters and Philosophy at the Sorbonne University where he knew Maxime Charles (whom Veuillot refused to defend in the 1958 dispute with cardinal Maurice Feltin for the Centre Richelieu, the Almshouse of Parish students) and Robert Frossard, his future auxiliary bishop.

After the degree in theology, he was ordained on 26 March 1939 in Paris by hand of the cardinal Verdier. For some months, Veuillot served as a curate in Asnières, near Paris. In 1939–1940, he was recalled in the French Army as captain and then he came back to Asnières. In October 1942, he was appointed professor of philosophy at the infant seminary of Conflans which was directed by the abbot Marc-Armand Lallier (1906-1988), the future bishop of Nancy. In 1942, he went to work in the Vatican Secretariat of State.

In 1947 Veuillot defended his doctoral dissertation in theology at the Institut Catholique de Paris.  In occasion of the golden wedding of his parents, he met the newly nominated nuncio Mgr Roncalli who gave him the opportunity to be received in Rome by the Pope Pius XII. In 1949 he was called to assist Mgr Jacques-Paul Martin and Mgr Dominique Pichon to replace Giovanni Battista Montini, the future pope Paul VI, who had become the Vatican Secretary of State for Extraordinary Affairs until 1952, before being promoted to the charge of pro-Secretary of State and then of Archbishop of Milan, from 1954. The previous year, Veuillot received the right to bear the title of Prelate of His Holiness, a right that elevated him to the episcopal dignity and gave him the capability to start the preparatory works of the encyclical Fidei donum, published in 1957 by Pius XII.
During this period, Veuillot share the same room with Mgr Achille Glorieux.

In 1959 Pope John XXIII appointed him Bishop of Angers. He remained in Angers until 12 June 1961, when he was appointed Coadjutor Archbishop of Paris with the titular see of Constantia in Thracia. On 1 December 1966 he became Archbishop of Paris, and on 26 June of the following year Pope Paul VI made him Cardinal-Priest of San Luigi dei Francesi as well. He died of leukemia on 14 February 1968 at the age of 55, having been a cardinal for only 6 months.

Notes 

1913 births
1968 deaths
Participants in the Second Vatican Council
Bishops of Angers
Archbishops of Paris
20th-century French cardinals
Cardinals created by Pope Paul VI
Burials at Notre-Dame de Paris
Deaths from leukemia
Deaths from cancer in France